Ash Turner (born 13 June 1975) is a New Zealand cricketer. He played in 8 first-class and 27 List A matches for Wellington from 2001 to 2005.

See also
 List of Wellington representative cricketers

References

External links
 

1975 births
Living people
New Zealand cricketers
Wellington cricketers
Cricketers from Lower Hutt